Douglas Edison Harding (12 February 1909 – 11 January 2007) was an English philosophical writer, mystic, spiritual teacher and author of a number of books, including On Having No Head: Zen and the Rediscovery of the Obvious (1961), which describes simple techniques he invented for readers to experience (not just understand) the non-duality of consciousness.

Life and career
Harding was born in Lowestoft in the county of Suffolk and raised in the Exclusive Plymouth Brethren, a Christian sect. When he was 21, he confronted the church Elders with a ten-page thesis of his objections and was apostatised. After graduating from University College, University of London thanks to a scholarship he was awarded as a result of coming top at the intermediate exams of the Royal Institute of British Architects, he practiced architecture in London and later in India. In India, during World War Two, Harding was commissioned as a Major and served in the British Army in the Royal Engineers.

Early work: The Hierarchy of Heaven and Earth 

In 1943, aged 34, after ten years of self-enquiry, study and writing, Harding had decided he was made of 'layers'. What he was depended on the range of the observer. As a result of his studies, Harding was convinced that he was human only at a certain range. Closer to, he saw himself as cellular, molecular, atomic. At very close range, therefore, he saw himself as almost nothing. It made sense to him therefore that at centre he was a mysterious 'nothingness'. In 1943, he looked back at himself and noticed that from his own point of view he was headless. He was looking not out of two eyes but a 'single eye', a boundless openness – an openness that was self-evidently aware, and was also full of the whole world. Here was direct experience of his central identity, his True Self. No longer did he have to rely on speculation. Following this he spent the next 8 years exploring the scientific, philosophical, psychological, and religious implications of his discovery, presented in his book The Hierarchy of Heaven and Earth, described by C. S. Lewis (who wrote the preface) as "a work of the highest genius". This book was published by Faber & Faber in 1952. After taking time off from his profession, Harding then returned to architecture.

"Headlessness" 

Harding continued to write, but it was not until 1961 that he clearly shared the experience of "headlessness" in his most famous book, On Having No Head: Zen and the Rediscovery of the Obvious. He encouraged readers to reproduce his realization in order to experience non-duality (anattā), i.e. that there is no separate self inhabiting your consciousness and “experiencing your experience”. He found that his headless insight was illustrated in a very clear way by a "self portrait" he found in Ernst Mach's book From The Analysis of Sensations (1891). The drawing, titled "View from the Left Eye"", inspired Douglas Harding to notice his own headlessness in 1942. 

Following this breakthrough, Harding gradually began to share this way of "seeing" more widely. In the late 1960s and early 1970s Harding developed his "experiments". Harding described these experiments as 'a breakthrough' in terms of making easily available the experience of 'who we really are', our true nature - which is "No-thing and Everything". Harding was emphatic that people tested out his claims for themselves - "you are the sole and final authority on you". He rejected the role of 'guru', always pointing others back to themselves. "Look for yourself".  Harding said of this meditation, "While it lasts, this is an all-or-nothing (actually, an All-and- Nothing) meditation which can't be done badly."

Sam Harris, in his book Waking Up: A Guide to Spirituality Without Religion, interprets Harding's assertion that he has no head by stating that Harding’s words "must be read in the first-person sense; the man was not claiming to have been literally decapitated. From a first-person point of view, his emphasis on headlessness is a stroke of genius that offers an unusually clear description of what it's like to glimpse the nonduality of consciousness".

Harding taught several techniques to help readers attain this experience. The first one is a pointing exercise: "Point to your feet, legs, belly, chest, then to what's above that. Go on looking at what your finger's now pointing to. Looking at what?"

Other work 

As well as writing many books and articles and developing experiments to demonstrate the concept of “Headlessness”, Harding also designed his Youniverse Explorer model, which models the layers of our body/mind, from the galaxy to particles, and includes at the centre of all these layers a clear sphere, symbolising one's True Nature - one's No-face.

Harding travelled widely, sharing the concepts of “Seeing” and “Headlessness”, as described in his most popular book, “On Having No Head: Zen and the Rediscovery of the Obvious”. In 1996, Richard Lang and Harding founded the Sholland Trust, a charity created to help share Harding's vision of “The Headless Way”. In the 1990s and early 2000s Harding travelled and gave workshops with his second wife, Catherine.

Harding was married twice and had two sons and a daughter. He died at Nacton near Ipswich, England.

Books
The Hierarchy of Heaven and Earth 
Look for Yourself: The Science and Art of Self-Realization 
On Having No Head:  Zen and the Rediscovery of the Obvious 
Head Off Stress 
Religions of the World 
To Be and Not To Be, That is the Answer: Unique Experiments for Tapping Our Infinite Resources 
The Trial of the Man who Said he was God 
The Little Book of Life and Death 
Open to the Source: Selected Teachings of Douglas E. Harding 
Face to No-Face: Rediscovering Our Original Nature 
As I See It: Articles, selected by Richard Lang. 
The Face Game: Liberation without Dogmas, Drugs or Delay. 
Visible Gods: A Modern Socratic Dialogue. 
The Science of the 1st Person: Its Principles, Practice and Potential. 
Journey To The Centre Of The Youniverse.

Films
On Having No Head: Seeing One's Original Nature

References

Chapter from On Having No Head quoted and reviewed in The Mind's I - Fantasies and Reflections on Self and Soul''. Hofstadter & Dennett, 1981 Penguin.

The Man With No Head: The Life and Ideas of Douglas Harding. Richard Lang & Victor Lunn Rockliffe.

External links
 Headless

1909 births
2007 deaths
20th-century English male writers
20th-century English philosophers
21st-century English male writers
21st-century British philosophers
English Christian mystics
English male non-fiction writers
English spiritual teachers
English spiritual writers
People from Lowestoft